Holton-le-Clay is a village, civil parish and electoral ward in the East Lindsey district of Lincolnshire, England, around  south of Grimsby. The village is twinned with Sargé-lès-le-Mans, Sarthe, France.

History
Ditched enclosures and boundaries of possible prehistoric or Roman origin have been found, and earthworks of Medieval origin, with tofts and crofts, are evident within and around the village.

In the Domesday account the village is written as "Holtone". It was within the manor of Tetney in the then Lindsey North Riding, and prior to the Norman conquest under the lordships of a Swein and  Thorgisl. By 1086 the manor had fallen under the lordship of Ivo Taillebois.

In 1885 Kelly's Directory noted a parish area of  acres, and an 1881 population of 283. Production of crops was chiefly of wheat, barley, oats, turnips and seeds. Principal landowners included the Earl of Scarborough DL, and George Henry Haigh DL JP of Grainsby Hall, Grimsby, Lincolnshire. The manor was owned by the Duchy of Lancaster, and rented to Sir Hugh Henry Cholmeley Bt DL JP of Easton Park. There was a Wesleyan chapel, built in 1827, and a Primitive Methodist chapel dated 1836. A further village station, Holton Village Halt, operated between 1905 and 1961.

Landmarks

The village Grade II* listed Anglican church is dedicated to St Peter. It consists of chancel, nave, and an embattled tower with 3 bells. Tower, chancel and nave arch are of Saxon or of very early Norman date. It was repaired and partly rebuilt in 1850 by William Hay, and restored and repaired in 1868. Cox noted that it was "nearly rebuilt in brick in 1850, but the tower is one of the many Lincolnshire instances of late Saxon architecture", and in 1964 Pevsner described it as "A rough and, at the time of writing, neglected church", with an 11th-century tower and west window, Decorated bell-openings, a Norman font, and a 1636 Paten cover. Within the churchyard is a 14th-century cross base and shaft.

Further listed buildings include ca.1800 Holton Lodge farm house, with attached pigeoncote.

Within the parish is Grade II listed Waithe Water Mill, dating from 1813.

Education
The village has two schools, Holton-le-Clay Infants School and Holton-le-Clay Junior School, for primary school age children. Local secondary schools include Tollbar Academy at New Waltham. The village is also in the catchment area for Louth's Louth Academy, Louth Academy and King Edward VI Grammar School.

Amenities
Village convenience shops include Lincolnshire Co-Operative and McColl's. There is also a pharmacy and two hairdressers, kebab, pizza, and fish and chip takeaway outlets. On Pinfold Lane is a pizza outlet and an Indian restaurant. The former Coulbeck's Hardware store on Louth Road in the heart of the village now hosts Four Candles cafe, a play on words attributed to The Two Ronnies comedy sketch as a tribute to the building's former purpose.

The parish council has renovated the former Etherington Arms into a village facility 'The Hornet's Nest' which holds village events. The facility was officially opened in May 2014.

The village has three public houses, The Jug and Bottle which serves carvery style food along with stonebaked pizza.  The Royal Oak has a sports bar area along with a more traditional family area for food and drinks. The Holt Family Bar on Pinfold Lane is the newest addition to the village.

Local food establishments score very highly with the Food Standards Agency for hygiene, with 19 out of 21 businesses scoring the maximum 5 rating (Very Good) and 2 businesses scoring a 4 rating (Good).

Other facilities include Peacefield Business Park. which has the North Thoresby GP surgery, a children's daycare centre, and a beauty salon.

Holton-le-Clay Cricket Club is off Tetney Lane, providing football, cricket and entertainment activities. The Eight Acres Playing Field has two full sized grass football pitches and children's play facilities, situated off Picksley Crescent.

Public transport is provided by the Stagecoach Group which runs a regular bus service to Grimsby and Louth.  The bus service is equipped with WiFi for passengers.

Annual events 

Holton le Clay Cricket Club holds two main annual events.  Holton Rocks!!! is a showcase of independent artists and since its launch in 2010 attracts visitors of all ages and is family oriented. Some acts are tribute acts. The event culminates in a firework display.

Also at the club is a firework display to coincide with Bonfire Night during November.  A bonfire is lit just before a large fireworks display. The event is usually held on a Friday or Saturday night.

A summer fayre is held during July at the village hall, with amusements, a display of vintage cars and tombola stalls.

Local democracy 
The Holton le Clay Parish Council is responsible for day-to-day village matters and produces regular minutes and agendas online.

Policing 
Holton-le-Clay is policed by the Louth Rural team of Lincolnshire Police. A small local police station operates part-time in the village and residents can sign up for an e-mail alerting service to keep track of local policing issues and incidents. Reported crimes for the village from January to August 2014 numbered 73.

Notable people
Hollie Arnold, the parasport athlete was born in Grimsby but grew up in Holton-le-Clay.

References

Sources

External links

" Holton le Clay", Genuki.org.uk. Retrieved 26 November 2011
Holton Le Clay Parish Council, Lincolnshire.gov.uk. Retrieved 30 October 2011

Villages in Lincolnshire
Civil parishes in Lincolnshire
East Lindsey District